The QF 4.7-inch Gun Mks I, II, III, and IV were a family of British quick-firing  naval and coast defence guns of the late 1880s and 1890s that served with the navies of various countries. They were also mounted on various wheeled carriages to provide the British Army with a long range gun. They all had a barrel of 40 calibres length.

The gun was originally designed to replace the older BL 5-inch (127 mm) naval guns. It was optimised for the modern smokeless propellants, such as Cordite, and could be loaded and fired far more rapidly than the BL 5-inch gun while firing a shell only slightly lighter.

Design and development
The guns were designed and manufactured by the Elswick Ordnance Company, part of Armstrong Whitworth. They were a major export item and hence were actually of 4.724 inches (120mm) calibre to meet the requirements of metricised navies: 4.7 inch is an approximation used for the British designation. The guns, Mark I to Mark III, were Pattern P, Pattern Q and Pattern T respectively. All three differed in detail of construction but were of the tube and hoop types. The Mark IV differed from these by incorporating a wire wound element to its construction. As first built, all used a three-motion screw breech, some were altered later by modifying the three-motion screw becoming "A" subtypes, or by fitting a single motion breech ("B" type). Army guns altered to use a bagged charge with a 3-inch steel (instead of the more usual brass) breech-sealing case were renumbered as Mark VI.

United Kingdom service

Royal Navy service
British pre-dreadnoughts and cruisers of the period used these guns. Total production was 154 Mark I, 91 Mark II, 338 Mark III and 584 Mark IV. The Royal Navy received 776 of these guns directly. The Army transferred a further 110 to the Navy.

The  gave up their guns to produce high-angle anti-aircraft guns to defend London.

By the First World War, the guns were obsolete for warship use, but many were re-mounted on merchant ships and troopships for defence against enemy submarines and commerce raiders.

British Army service
In land service, limited numbers were mounted for use as fixed coast artillery. In addition, some Mark IV guns were mounted on converted 40-Pr Rifled Breech Loading Gun carriages for use by batteries of the Royal Garrison Artillery (Volunteers) from the early 1900s. The 1st Ayrshire and Galloway Royal Garrison Artillery (Volunteers) received a number of these guns in 1903 to provide armament for their three heavy batteries. These batteries were semi-mobile and equipped with limbers, which could be drawn by horses or gun tractors. They continued in use with artillery units of the Territorial Force, with some being used into the First World War.

Second Boer War (1899–1902)

British forces in the Second Boer War were initially outgunned by the long range Boer artillery. Captain Percy Scott of HMS Terrible first improvised timber static siege mountings for two  guns from the Cape Town coastal defences, to counter the Boers' "Long Tom" gun during the Siege of Ladysmith in 1899–1900. Captain Scott then improvised a travelling carriage for 4.7-inch guns removed from their usual static coastal or ship mountings to provide the army with a heavy field gun. These improvised carriages lacked recoil buffers and hence in action drag shoes and attachment of the carriage by cable to a strong point in front of the gun were necessary to control the recoil. They were manned by Royal Navy crews and required up to 32 oxen to move.

First World War

South-West Africa Campaign (1914–1915)

The same guns mounted on "Percy Scott" carriages were used by South African forces against German forces in the South-West Africa campaign in the First World War. Guns were landed at Lüderitz Bay in October 1914 and later at Walvis Bay in February 1915 and moved inland across the desert in support of South African troops.

Western Front (1914–1917)

Up to 92 QF 4.7-inch guns on more modern Mk I "Woolwich" carriages dating from June 1900 with partially effective (12-inch) recoil buffers, and on heavier "converted" carriages from old RML 40 pounder guns, went to France with Royal Garrison Artillery units, mostly of the Territorial Force, in 1914–1917.

They figured prominently in the early battles, such as at Neuve Chapelle in March 1915 where there were 32, and only 12 60-pounders, assigned to counter-battery fire. General Farndale reports that counter-battery fire there failed to deal with the German artillery, but ascribes the failure to the as yet imprecise nature of long range map shooting, and the difficulty of maintaining forward observers on the flat terrain.

By the Battle of Aubers Ridge on 9 May 1915, the barrels of the 28 guns of the 3rd and 8th Heavy Brigades and the 1st West Riding and 1st Highland Heavy Batteries engaged were now so worn that driving bands were stripped off shells at the muzzle, limiting accuracy. In addition, two guns in the armoured train "Churchill" were in action at Aubers Ridge. Thirty-three 60-pounders were available. Counter-battery fire again failed due to the inaccuracy of the worn-out guns and also because the army still lacked accurate means of locating enemy guns, as air observation and reporting and use of radio was only beginning.

The inaccuracy through wear and the relatively light shell diminished their usefulness in the developing trench warfare, and they were replaced by the modern 60-pounder guns as they became available. At the Battle of the Somme in June–July 1916, there were 32 4.7-inch guns and 128 60-pounders engaged. However, the last were not withdrawn until April 1917. Guns withdrawn from the Western Front were redeployed to other fronts, such as Italy and Serbia.

Battle of Gallipoli (1915)

A 4.7-inch gun was used by the 1st Heavy Artillery Battery, a joint unit of Australians and Royal Marines, on Gallipoli to counter long range Turkish fire from the "Olive Grove" (in fact "Palamut Luk" or Oak Grove) between Gaba Tepe and Maidos. Lt-Colonel Rosenthal, commanding 3rd Australian Field Artillery Brigade, noted : "I had made continual urgent representations for two 4.7-inch guns for right flank to deal with innumerable targets beyond the range of 18-prs., but it was not till 11 July that one very old and much worn gun arrived, and was placed in position on right flank, firing its first round on 26 July." This gun was destroyed and left behind at the withdrawal from Gallipoli but later salvaged as a museum piece. The burst barrel is on display at the Australian War Memorial.

Salonika front
Several  guns mounted on "Percy Scott" carriages served with British and Serb forces in the Salonika (Macedonian) campaign from January 1916 onwards.

Italian service
In Italian service, QF 4.7-inch guns were known as 120/40 A 1889 and 120/40 A 1891. Italian guns produced under license by Ansaldo were similar in construction to the British Mk I*. They armed auxiliary cruisers, dreadnought battleships, ironclads, predreadnought battleships, protected cruisers and torpedo cruisers of the Regia Marina. They saw action aboard ships in the Italo-Turkish War, World War I, Second Italo-Ethiopian War and World War II.

Japanese service

First Sino-Japanese War
Japanese belted cruiser Chiyoda launched in 1890 was armed with ten QF 4.7-inch Guns in single mounts, mounted one each in the bow and stern, and four on each side in sponsons. This was one of the first naval use of this gun. After Chiyoda, the Imperial Japanese Navy aggressively introduced quick-firing guns in their cruisers. Six Japanese cruisers that fought Battle of the Yalu River in 1894 had a total of 60 QF 4.7-inch guns. Along with eight QF 6-inch guns, overwhelming superiority in quick-firing guns of the Japanese Fleet gave it tactical advantage over the Chinese Beiyang Fleet and was one of the decisive factors of the Naval Battle.

Licensed products
The Japanese Type 41 4.7-inch/40 (12 cm) naval gun was a license-produced copy of the Elswick Mark IV. Initially, a number were procured directly from Elswick in England. After the turn of the century, production in Japan was under the designation "Mark IVJ". The gun was re-designated as Type 41 on 25 December 1908, after the 41st year in the reign of Japanese Emperor Meiji. It was further re-designated in centimeters on 5 October 1917 as part of the standardization process for the Imperial Japanese Navy to the metric system. Although finally classified as a "12 cm" gun the bore was unchanged at 4.724 inches.

During the First World War, the Japanese Navy transferred 24 original Elswick-built and 13 Mark IVJ to Britain as part of their military assistance to the Allies under the Anglo-Japanese Alliance. In 1940, some of these weapons were emplaced in British coastal defence batteries; for instance, at Mersea Island in Essex.

Some units were still in service as late as the Pacific War.

United States service

In 1898, the United States Army acquired 35 British QF 4.7-inch guns; these were designated "4.72-inch Armstrong guns". Eighteen were 40 caliber Mark IV weapons, thirteen were 45 caliber, and four were 50 caliber; apparently the 45 and 50 caliber guns were non-standard export models. These and the nine 6-inch Armstrong guns acquired at the same time appear to have been purchased to rapidly arm coast defense batteries with modern quick-firing medium-caliber weapons due to the outbreak of the Spanish–American War. It was feared that the Spanish fleet might bombard US East Coast ports. The massive Endicott program of coast defenses was still years from completion, and most existing defenses dated from the 1870s with muzzle-loading weapons. By the end of 1899, 34 of the 4.7-inch guns had been deployed at 17 forts on the East and Gulf Coasts; the remaining gun (40 caliber) was retained for testing at the Sandy Hook Proving Ground at Fort Hancock, New Jersey.

The projectiles listed in US manuals for these weapons were a common cast iron practice round, a common steel explosive round, a strong-headed steel explosive round, and a shrapnel round with a time/percussion fuze, each . The 40 caliber gun used 7.5 pounds of nitrocellulose powder, while the 45 and 50 caliber guns used 10.5 pounds of nitrocellulose in a larger case.

The United States Navy acquired two protected cruisers in 1898 with four British-made export-model 4.7-inch 50 caliber guns each, along with a 6-inch main battery. These were under construction for Brazil at Elswick, and the US acquired them partly to prevent their purchase by Spain, renaming them as the New Orleans class. One source states the 6-inch guns were Elswick Pattern DD and the 4.7-inch guns were Pattern AA. Their guns were unique in the US Navy, and they were designated "4.7"/50 caliber Mark 3 Armstrong guns". During refits at the Cavite Navy Yard in the Philippines in 1903, both ships had their 4.7-inch guns replaced with standard USN 5-inch guns; the 6-inch guns followed in 1907. At least some of the guns from these ships were emplaced in the Grande Island/Subic Bay area 1907–1910 and operated by the United States Marine Corps Advanced Base Force until the Coast Artillery Corps' modern defenses centered on Fort Wint were completed.

In 1913–1914, eight 4.7-inch 45 caliber guns were redeployed from the US to Fort Ruger and Fort Kamehameha in Hawaii, including two spares. The Endicott and Taft fortification programs were largely complete by this time, with most 4.7-inch guns superseded by 6-inch guns. The four 4.7-inch 50 caliber guns at Fort Monroe were placed in reserve in 1914, with one transferring to Sandy Hook for tests and the others stored at the Augusta Arsenal in Georgia.

The American entry into the war in 1917 saw more redeployment of 4.7-inch weapons. Eight Mark IV 40 caliber weapons from less-threatened forts were loaned to the Army Transport Service for the duration of hostilities and may have armed troop transports and cargo ships; they were returned in 1919 and promptly disposed of. Two Mark IV 40 caliber weapons were redeployed from Fort Strong in Boston Harbor to Sachuest Point in Middletown, Rhode Island. The three 50 caliber guns stored at Augusta, GA were deployed to San Juan, Puerto Rico at Fort Brooke, as Castillo San Felipe del Morro (often called "Morro Castle") was known at the time. Following the war, all 4.7-inch weapons were withdrawn from service by the end of 1920, and all were disposed of by 1927. Other weapons deployed in limited quantity were also retired during this period. 24 weapons were given to various cities and towns or retained in Hawaii as war memorials; only six survive. Most of the remainder were probably donated during Second World War scrap drives.

Ammunition

Ammunition was of fixed QF type.

The gun was able to fire:
Armor piercing
Common
Common pointed
High explosive
Illumination
Shrapnel

Surviving examples

Preserved 4.7"/40 (12 cm) Mark IV*/VI on field carriage outdoors at Artillery Park, Valladolid, Spain
The burst gun barrel from Gallipoli is displayed at the Australian War Memorial, Canberra
Naval gun on display at the Museo Tecnico Navala Della Spezia, Italy
Japanese-built 4.7"/40 Mark IV in the Military Museum of Finland in Suomenlinna, Finland
4.7-inch QF Gun, No. 563, Mark IV, manufactured in 1894 by Royal Gun Factory, preserved in courtyard of Indian Museum at Kolkata (Calcutta)
2 QF 4.7-inch B Mk IV* guns on central pivot mounts, Fort Amherst, St. John's, Newfoundland
2 QF 4.7-inch B Mk IV* guns on central pivot mounts, Bell Island, Newfoundland
2 QF 4.7-inch B Mk IV* guns on central pivot mounts, Fort Peninsula, Quebec
1 QF 4.7-inch B Mk IV* gun on central pivot mount, Fort Prevel, Quebec (upside down on mount with shield attached backwards)
QF 4.7-inch Mk IV Armstrong No. 12123 on central pivot mount Mk 1 No. 10981 (Formerly emplaced at Battery Talbot, Fort Adams, RI), location: Equality Park, Newport, RI
QF 4.7-inch Mk IV Armstrong No. 12124 on central pivot mount Mk 1 No. 10982 (Formerly emplaced at Battery Talbot, Fort Adams, RI), location: Battery Bingham, Fort Moultrie, Sullivan's Island, South Carolina (shield missing)
QF 4.7-inch Mk IV Armstrong No. 11856 on central pivot mount Mk 1 No. 10842 (Formerly emplaced at Battery Drum, Fort Strong, Massachusetts), location: State Armory, Main Street, Ansonia, Connecticut
QF 4.7-inch Mk IV Armstrong No. 9718 on central pivot mount Mk 1 No. 10841 (Formerly emplaced at Battery Van Swearingen, Fort Pickens, Florida), location: County Courthouse, Danielsville, Georgia
QF 4.7-inch Armstrong 45 calibre No. 11933 (formerly emplaced at Battery Dodge, Fort Ruger, Hawaii), location: State Armory, Wahiawa, Oahu, Hawaii (upside down resting on shield top)
QF 4.7-inch Armstrong 45 calibre No. 11009 (formerly emplaced at Battery Dodge, Fort Ruger), location: State Armory, Wahiawa, Oahu, HI (upside down resting on shield top)
QF 4.7-inch/50 calibre Mark 3 Armstrong (US Navy designation) (From ), location: Kane County, Illinois, Soldier and Sailor Monument at former courthouse, Geneva, Illinois
QF 4.7-inch/50 calibre Mark 3 Armstrong (US Navy designation) (From ), location: Kane County, Illinois, Soldier and Sailor Monument at former courthouse, Geneva, Illinois

See also
QF 4.7-inch Mk V naval gun – 45-calibre version used on merchant ships in both world wars.
List of naval guns
List of field guns

Weapons of comparable role, performance and era
4.7-inch gun M1906, US field gun of same calibre

Notes

References

Bibliography
Text Book of Gunnery , 1902. London: Printed for His Majesty's Stationery Office, by Harrison and Sons, St. Martin's Lane
Handbook of the Q.F. 4.7-inch B (Mark IV*) Gun, on travelling carriage. For Volunteer Batteries. Land Service, 1902. London: Printed for His Majesty's Stationery Office, by Harrison and Sons, St. Martin's Lane

Tony Bridgland, Field Gun Jack Versus the Boers: The Royal Navy in South Africa 1899–1900. Leo Cooper, 1998. .

Dale Clarke, British Artillery 1914–1919: Field Army Artillery. Osprey Publishing, Oxford UK, 2004. .
Tony DiGiulian, 4.7"/40 (12 cm) Elswick 4.7"/40 (12 cm) QF Marks I, II, III, IV and VI
General Sir Martin Farndale, History of the Royal Regiment of Artillery. [New Series. Vol.1] Western Front 1914–18. London: Royal Artillery Institution, 1986. .

Major Darrell Hall, "Guns in South Africa 1899–1902 Part III and IV". South African Military History Society, Military History Journal, Vol 2 No 2, December 1971.
 Major Darrell Hall, "The Naval Guns in Natal 1899–1902". The South African Military History Society Military History Journal, Vol 4 No 3, June 1978.
I.V. Hogg & L.F. Thurston, British Artillery Weapons & Ammunition 1914–1918. London: Ian Allan, 1972.

Ross Mallett, AIF Artillery. updated 2005

Lieut.-Colonel Charles Rosenthal, Commanding 3rd Australian Field Artillery Brigade, 1st Australian Division, Notes relating to Artillery at Anzac, from 25 April to 25 August 1915. (Compiled from personal diary.) Appendix II in General Sir Ian Hamilton, G.C.B. Gallipoli Diary Vol. II. New York: George H. Doran Company, 1920.
Admiral Percy Scott, Fifty Years in the Royal Navy, published 1919.
"Instructions for 4.724-inch 120 mm Quick Firing Armstrong Gun and Automatic Centre Pivot Mounting", 1880s, as supplied to Australian colonies. From National Archives of Australia.

External links

Handbook of the 4.7-inch q.f. gun, land service, 1898 at State Library of Victoria
Handbook of the Q.F. 4.7-inch B, mark IV, gun, on travelling carriage, for volunteer batteries, land service, 1902 at State Library of Victoria
Instructions for mounting, using, and caring for 4.72-inch gun, Armstrong 40 caliber, on barbette carriage, Armstrong. 1904, 1908, 1911. Washington, Government Printing Office, 1917 at State Library of Victoria
Handbook of the Q.F. 4.7-inch "B" guns on travelling carriages : land service, 1910 at State Library of Victoria
Drill for 4.7-inch Q.F. gun (fixed armaments) London : H.M.S.O. 1912 at State Library of Victoria
handbook for the 4.7-inch Q.F. gun (heavy batteries), gun drill, 1915 at State Library of Victoria
Gun drill for 4.7-inch Q.F. gun (land service) 1924 at State Library of Victoria
Diagram and photograph of gun on RML 40-pounder "Converted" traveling carriage at Victorian Forts and Artillery website
Paul Benyon, Illustrated London News December 1899 – April 1900 – Blue Jackets with their Guns ashore

 

Naval guns of the United Kingdom
World War I guns
World War I artillery of the United Kingdom
120 mm artillery
Elswick Ordnance Company
Victorian-era weapons of the United Kingdom
World War I artillery of the United States
Coastal artillery